These are the official results of the Men's 20 km walk event at the 1990 European Championships in Split, Yugoslavia, held on 28 August 1990. There were a total number of 22 athletes, who finished the race.

Medalists

Results

Final
28 August

Participation
According to an unofficial count, 28 athletes from 16 countries participated in the event.

 (3)
 (3)
 (1)
 (1)
 (1)
 (1)
 (3)
 (1)
 (2)
 (3)
 (3)
 (1)
 (1)
 (2)
 (1)
 (1)

See also
 1988 Men's Olympic 20km Walk (Seoul)
 1991 Men's World Championships 20km Walk (Tokyo)
 1992 Men's Olympic 20km Walk (Barcelona)
 1994 Men's European Championships 20km Walk (Helsinki)

References

 Results

Walk 20 km
Racewalking at the European Athletics Championships